Narubadin Weerawatnodom (born 12 July 1994) is a Thai professional footballer who plays as a right-back for Thai League 1 club Buriram United and the Thailand national team.

Club career
After finishing the 2014 Thai Premier League with BEC-Tero Sasana, Narubadin moved to Buriram United after the two clubs agreed to trade him with Adisak Kraisorn.

International career
Narubadin won the AFF U-19 Youth Championship with Thailand U19, and played in 2012 AFC U-19 Championship.
Narubadin played in the 2013 King's Cup, he also scored a goal in the tournament against Finland national football team. Narubadin scored against Brunei U23 and Faroe Islands. He represented Thailand U23 in the 2013 Southeast Asian Games.
He also represented Thailand U23 in the 2014 Asian Games. Narubadin is part of Thailand's squad in the 2014 AFF Suzuki Cup. In May 2015, he played for Thailand in the 2018 FIFA World Cup qualification (AFC) against Vietnam.
He won the 2015 Southeast Asian Games with Thailand U23.

Club statistics

International goals

Under-23

Senior

Honours

Club
BEC Tero Sasana
 Thai League Cup (1): 2014

Buriram United
 Thai League 1 (4): 2015, 2017, 2018, 2021-22
 Thai FA Cup (2): 2015, 2021-22
 Thai League Cup (3): 2015, 2016, 2021–22
 Kor Royal Cup (2): 2015, 2016
 Mekong Club Championship (2): 2015, 2016
 Thailand Champions Cup (1): 2019

International
Thailand U-19
 AFF U-19 Youth Championship (1): 2011

Thailand U-23
 SEA Games  Gold Medal (2): 2013, 2015
Thailand

 AFF Championship (2): 2014, 2020
 King's Cup (1): 2016

Individual
AFF Championship Best eleven: 2020

Personal life
He is the older brother of actress Tipnaree Weerawatnodom.

References

External links
 
 
 

1994 births
Living people
Narubadin Weerawatnodom
Narubadin Weerawatnodom
Association football defenders
Narubadin Weerawatnodom
Narubadin Weerawatnodom
Narubadin Weerawatnodom
Narubadin Weerawatnodom
Narubadin Weerawatnodom
Footballers at the 2014 Asian Games
Narubadin Weerawatnodom
Southeast Asian Games medalists in football
Competitors at the 2013 Southeast Asian Games
Competitors at the 2015 Southeast Asian Games
Narubadin Weerawatnodom